Outer membrane may refer to:
 Bacterial outer membrane, of a gram negative bacterium cell
 Outer mitochondrial membrane
 Chloroplast outer membrane, of plant and algal cells
 Outer nuclear membrane, of the nuclear envelope in eukaryotic cells